Ampelokipoi (meaning vineyards) is a suburb of the Thessaloniki Urban Area and was a former municipality in the regional unit of Thessaloniki, Greece. Since the 2011 local government reform it is part of the municipality of Ampelokipoi-Menemeni, of which it is a municipal unit. The population was 37381 in 2011, with a land area of 1.803 km². Ampelokipoi is the seat of the new Ampelokipoi-Menemeni municipality.

Areas 
Ampelokipoi include the areas of Heptalofos, Skeparni, Kaistri, Philippou and Akriton.

Sport activities 

The municipal sports club AO Ampelokipon has football, basketball, volleyball, swimming and athletic clubs. The local stadium was a training center for the Olympic Games of 2004.

Other
In the area is located also the Zeitenlik WWI Allied cemetery, such as the Catholic cemetery of Saint Vincent.

See also
 Zeitenlik

References

External links
Official website 

Populated places in Thessaloniki (regional unit)